This is a list of programs previously aired by Intercontinental Broadcasting Corporation. For the current shows of this network, see List of programs broadcast by Intercontinental Broadcasting Corporation.

Original/station-produced defunct programs

IBC News and Public Affairs

Newscasts
The 11 O'Clock News (1990–1992)
Balita sa IBC (1986–1989)
Balita sa IBC Huling Ulat (1986–1989)
Balita sa Tanghali (1986–1989)
Bantay Balita (1989–1990)
Chinese News TV (2019–2020)
CNN News Update
CTN Midnite (1995–1998)
Daily Info (2020) (several times)
Eight o' Clock Newsbreak
Final Edition News
Headline Trese (1989–1992, 1997–1998)
IBC Balita Ngayon (1998–2000)
IBC Headliners (1994–2011, 2021)
IBC News 5 O'Clock Report (1992)
IBC News 5:30 Report (1992–1995)
IBC News 11 O'Clock Report (1992–1995)
IBC News Tonight (2002–2011)
IBC NewsBreak (1992–1994, 2014–2018)
IBC TV X-Press (1995–1997)
International News Report (1992–1993)
Islands Newsbreak (1991–1992)
Mid-day Report (1984–1986)
News @ 1 (several times)
News @ 6 (several times)
News and Views with Abel Cruz (2009–2011)
News Team 13 (2011–2019)
News Team 13 @ 10PM/11PM (2011–2015)
Newsday (1975–1986)
PNA Newsroom (2019–2022, produced by Philippine News Agency)
PSE Live: The Stock Market Today (1996–1997)
PTV News (2020) (several times)
 Public Briefing: #LagingHandaPH(2020, 2022-2023; simulcast on PTV and Radyo Pilipinas)
RadyoBisyon (2014–2017)
Ronda Trese (2000–2002)
Ulat Bayan Weekend (2022-2023; simulcast on PTV and Radyo Pilipinas)

Public affairs programs
30/30
Agring-Agri (1990–1991)
Ang Paghahatol (Impeachment Trial of Joseph Estrada): The IBC 13 News Coverage (2000)
Asenso Pinoy (2006–2011)
AutoVote 2010 (2010)
Bagong Maunlad na Agrikultura (2010–2011)
Bahay at Bahay (1991–1998)
Bet to Serve (2022)
Botong Wais (2001)
Buhay Pinoy (2005–2008, 2008–2011)
Business and Beyond (2016)
COMELEC Hour (1980)
Consumers Desk (2019–2020)
Dial M (2010)
DU30 on Duty (2019–2022)
Entrepinoy Start-Up (2002–2005)
The Estrada Presidency (1998–2001)
Export... Made in the Philippines (1986–1993)
Extra Express (2010–2011)
For God and Country (1995)
FVR Up Close (1992–1998)
Gen EleXions: The Comelec Time '98 (1998)
Good Take (2000–2005, 2009)
Hanep Buhay
Hotline sa Trese (1990–1992)
I-Barangay Mo! (2003)
Ikaw ang Humatol (1991–1997)
Iskoolmates (2019, produced by People's Television Network, 2019)
Kapihan sa Media ng Bayan (2015)
Kapihan sa Nayon
Konsumer Korner (1995–1996)
LGU
Laging Handa Dokyu (2020–2022, produced by Presidential Communications Operations Office)
Linawin Natin (2001–2007)
Lingkod Bayan ni Tony Falcon (1999–2000)
Look Up with Evelyn Atayde (1990)
Mag Agri Tayo (1990)
Magandang Umaga Ba? (1995–1998)
Malacañang Press Conference
Meet The Press
Metro Magazine (1980)
Morning Brew (1990–1992)
Nation's Peacekeepers (2010–2011)
Network Briefing News (2020–2022)
No Nonsense! (1991–1995)
One Morning Cafe (2007–2010)
One on One (1994)
OOTD: Opisyal of the Day (2019)
Opinyon at Desisyon
OPS-PIA: Ugnayan sa Hotel Rembrandt (1992–2001)
Paliwanagan (2001)
People First (2002)
Plataporma at Isyu (1987)
 Pointblank (1985–1986)
Public Eye (2019, produced by People's Television Network)
Public Forum (1987–1990)
Pulsong Pinoy (2011–2013)
Radyo Kongreso sa Telebisyon (2007)
Rey Langit: The Philippine Connection (1988)
Report Kay Boss (2013–2016)
Serbis on the Go (2004–2008)
Serbisyong Bayan
Straight to the Point (2009)
Talakayan ng Bayan
Tapatan Kay Luis Beltran (1987–1988)
Truth Forum (1986–1987)
Ugnayang Pambansa
Ugnayan sa Tri-Media
Up Close and Personal with Marissa del Mar (2002–2011)
Usisera-Intrigera (1996)
Uswag Pinas! (2019–2021, produced by Presidential Communications Operations Office)
Vigilantes (1970–1972, 1973–1975)
Youth for Truth (2020–2022, produced by Presidential Communications Operations Office)
The Working President (2001–2010)

Public service
Amerika Atbp. (2000–2008)
Arnelli in da Haus (2019–2020)
Bitag: The New Generation (2003–2011, 2019)
Citizens Patrol (2000–2001)
Direct Line
FYI  (2020–2022, produced by Office of the Press Secretary and Freedom of Information Project Management Office)
Hapi Kung Healthy (1999–2002)
Health Line (2009–2013)
Health Med (2011)
Heartwatch (1992–1994)
Hotline sa 13 (1990–1992)
Ikaw at ang Batas
Iyo Ang Katarungan (2003–2010)
Kalusugan ay Kayamanan (1990)
Kalusugan ng Bayan
Kasangga Mo ang Langit (2008–2013)
Mahal (1990–1998)
More Than Export 
Network Briefing News (2020–2022)
Nora Mismo (2002)
Rescue 911
RX: Nutrisyon at Kalusugan (2011)
Saklolo Abugado (2001)
SSS: Kabalikat Natin (2010–2011)
Trash en Traffic (2002)
Ultimatum (2009–2010)
Usap-Usapan Live (1990–1992)

Drama/serials
24 Oras (1990–1991, not to be confused with GMA's newscast in 2004)
Aiko Drama Special (1989–1995)
Aksyon sa Telebisyon
Alagad
All About Adam (2010)
Andrea Amor (1986–1987)
Ang Tungkod ni Moises
Buhay Kartero (1994)
Bukas May Kahapon (2019, produced by SMAC Television Production)
Dahong Ginto (1973–1975)
Dear Teacher (1990–1992)
El Corazon de Oro (1989–1990)
Familia de Honor
H2K: Hati-Hating Kapatid (2000–2001, produced by Viva Television)
Habang May Buhay (1975–1977, 2000–2002, produced by Viva Television)
Hiyas (1986–1987, produced by AstroVisions)
IBC Love Stories (1993)
Ito ang Inyong Tia Dely (1977–1978)
Kapag May Katwiran, Ipaglaban Mo! (1988–1992, produced by Nova Enterprises Production International)
Kroko: Takas sa Zoo (2010)
Krusada Kontra Korupsyon (2007–2008)
Krusada Kontra Krimen (2005–2007)
Manila Manila
May Bukas Pa (2000, produced by Viva Television)
Mga Himala at Gintong Aral ng El Shaddai (1994–1997)
Noli Me Tangere (2013–2014)
Pangarap Kong Jackpot (1997–1998; re-aired 2007–2010)
Pangako ng Lupa (2002, produced by Viva Television)
Regal Drama Presents
Regal Juvenile
Regal Theatre (1987)
Salamin ng Buhay (1983–1984)
Seiko TV Presents (1989–1991)
Subic Bay (2000–2001, produced by Viva Television)
Ula ang Batang Gubat (1990–1991)
Viva Telecine sa 13 (1987–1988)

Fantasy/horror
Computer Kid (1991)
Computerman (1990–1991)
Kagat ng Dilim (2000–2002, produced by Viva Television)
Magic Kamison (1990–1992)
Mga Kuwento ni Lola Basyang (1990–1992)
Ora Engkantada (1986–1990)
Pinoy Thriller (1986–1989)
Reelen & Rocken
Regal Shocker (1989–1991)
Seiko Supernatural Stories (1988)
Squad 13 (1987)
Stowaway
Takot Ka Ba Sa Dilim? (1998–1999, produced by Vintage Television and Viva Television)

Comedy
13, 14, 15 (1989–1990)
24 Karats Daw, O 'Di Ba?
Ang Boyfriend Kong Mamaw (E.T. Pala)
Ang Manok Ni San Pedro (1990–1991)
Ano Ba'ng Hanap Mo (2006–2007)
Ayos Lang, Tsong! (1988)
Agent Oskee (1992–1994)
Back to Iskul Bukol (1999–2000, produced by Vintage Television and Viva Television)
Barok-an Subdivision (1977–1978)
Bistek
Brodkast Workshap
Buddy Buddy
Buhok Pinoy (1977)
C.U.T.E. (Call Us Two for Entertainment) (1980)
Chicks for Cats (1987–1988)
Chicks to Chicks (1979–1987)
Daddy Ko, Daddy Ko!
Daddy Kong 123
D'Kilabotinis
Don Kamote de la Mantsa (1985)
Eh Kasi, Babae (1987)
Four Da Boys (1991–1993)
Gags Must Be Crazy (2000–2001, produced by Viva Television)
Gets Mo? Gets Ko!
Goin' Bananas (1986–1987)
Goin' Bayabas (1998–1999, produced by Vintage Television)
Hapi House! (1987–1990; re-runs, 2019)
Iskul Bukol (1978–1990, produced by Our Own Little Way Productions)
J2J
K
Kalatog Pa Rin (1989)
Kopi Shop (2002)
Last Fool Show (2000–2001)
Let's Go
Mongolian Barbecue (1990–1992)
O 'Di Ba?
O, Sige! (1987)
OK Lang (1975)
OK ka'tol
Okay Ka, Fairy Ko! (1987–1989, produced by M-ZET TV Productions)
Pinoy TV Komiks
PTL: Plato, Traysikel at Ligaya
Pubhouse (1987–1988)
S.A.T.S.U. (2002)
Sic O'Clock News (1987–1990; re-runs, 2019)
Sitak Ni Jack (1987–1989)
T.A.H.O.! (Tawanan at Awitan kay Hesus Oras-oras) (1996–1998)
T.O.D.A.S. (1980–1989; 1993)
T.O.D.A.S.: Television's Outrageously Delightful Afternoon Show (1980–1981)
T.O.D.A.S.: Television's Outrageously Delightful All-Star Show (1981–1989; re-runs, 2019)
T.O.D.A.S. Again (1993)
Takeshi's Castle (1990)
TVJ: Television's Jesters (1989–1992)
Wow! (1998–2000, produced by Vintage Television)
Working Girls (1987)

Kid-oriented
Abakada Barkada
Ang Galing Mo Bata
Chikiting Patrol (1989–1990)
FNRI Puppet Videos (2011)
Funfare
Kidcetera (2003)
Kidding Aside
Kulit Bulilit
Mga Bata Pa Kami
Ora Engkantada (1986–1990)
Smart Cookies
Televisions
Tic Tac Boom (1988)
TV Wonderland
Y2K: Yes 2 Kids (1998–2001)

Talk shows
Celebrations (2002)
Chairman of the Board and Company
Friday Night at the Movies (1980)
IBC Nightline
It's My Life with Troy Montero (2011)
Klik na Klik sa Trese (1997–2001)
Maiba Naman with Didi Domingo (1994–1995)
Morning Brew
Pare Kuys (2019, produced by SMAC Television Production)
Pilipinas Ngayon (2003)
Pillow Talk (1996–1998, produced by Vintage Television)
Serbisyong Bayan
Star Cafe (1987)
Sunrise sa Tanghali
Talakayan ng Bayan
Talk Toons (2008)

Showbiz-oriented talk shows
Celebrity DAT Com (2003–2004)
Cinemascoop (1996–1997, produced by Vintage Television)
Enter JJ (1976–1978)
Hollywood Nights (1996–1997, produced by Vintage Television)
Premiere Night
Rated E (1996–1998, produced by Vintage Television)
Regal Showbiz Eye (1987–1988, produced by Regal Television, 1987–1988)
Rumors, Facts, & Humors
Scoop (1986–1987)
See True (1980–1986, produced by LOCA Productions)
Seeing Stars with Joe Quirino (1973–1986)
Showbiz Eye (1988)
Showbiz Talkies (1994–1996)
Showbiz Unlimited (2015, season break)
Sine Silip (1991–1992)
Stars & Spies (1994–1995)
True or False (1985, produced by LOCA Productions)

Variety and musical
Alas Dose sa Trese (1999–2000)
An Evening with Raoul (2017)
Apat na Sikat (1975–1981)
ASK TV: Artihan, Sayawan at Kantahan (2018–2020)
Awitawanan (1990–1992)
Baliw
The Best of Retro featuring FBC (Family Birth Control) Rebirth (2018)
By Request (2009–2011)
Chairman and Friends at Faces (1990–1991)
Chopsuey Espesyal (1998–1999)
Chowtime Na! (2005)
Chowtime Na! Laban Na! (2005–2006)
Dance Tonight (1988)
The Dawn And Jimmy Show (1989)
Dito Na Kami (1975–1979)
DMZ TV (2000–2001)
Flipside (1992–1994)
Good Afternoon Po... Guguluhin Namin Kayo... Salamat Po (1975–1977)
It's Chowtime! (2004–2005)
The Jazz Show (1991)
Kalatog sa Trese (1987–1988)
Klik na Klik sa Trese (1997–2001)
Kuh by Special Arrangement
Loveliness (1988–1990)
Lunch Break (2000–2003)
Maricel Live! (1986)
MTV Philippines (2005)
Musika Atbp. (2001–2002)
MVTV (1996–1998)
Once Upon a Turntable
Pinoy Music Video (2000–2001)
Rap 13 (1997–1998)
Ratsada E (2007–2008)
Regal Family
Saturday Nite Live (1990)
Sunday Funday
Sunday Special, Iba Ito!
The Sharon Cuneta Show (1986–1988, produced by Viva Television)
SMAC Pinoy Ito! (2019, produced by SMAC Television Production)
SMS: Sunday Mall Show (2005–2006)
Stand Out Party
Superstar: The Legend (1989–1990)
Teen Star (1980)
This Is It! (1983–1984)
Tunog Kalye

Game shows
Alas Suerte (2000–2001, produced by MMG Entertainment Group, Inc.)
Fastbreak (1999–2000, produced by Vintage Television)
Game Channel (2003–2004)
Gameworld (1976–1977)
Islands Gamemasters (1990–1992)
Lucky 13 (1977–1981)
National Super Quiz Bee (1996–2001)
Super Games (1991)
The Weakest Link (2001–2002, produced by Viva Television)
Turn on 13 (1981–1986)
Who Wants to Be a Millionaire? (2000–2002, produced by Viva Television)

Reality shows
Artista Teen Quest (2019, produced by SMAC Television Production)
Chowtime: Conquest (2006)
My Ultimate Modelo 2019 (2019, produced by SMAC Television Production)
On-Air Tambayan (2005)
SINGLE (Celebrity Single and Season VII, 2005)

Talent shows
Birit Bulilit (1995–1996)
Paligsahan sa Awit
Pasikatan sa 13 (1992–1994)
Star for a Night (2002–2003, produced by Viva Television)

Youth-oriented shows
Campus Break (1989–1990)
Dear Heart (1998–2000, produced by Vintage Television and Viva Television)
DREDD Sessions (1996, produced by Viva Television)
Details 0923 (1997–1998)
Mag Smile Club Na! (1996–1999)
P.Y. (Praise Youth) (1992–1996)

Sports shows
ABP Touchdown (2015)
AKTV (2011–2013)
Auto Review
ASEAN Basketball League (2010–2011)
ATC E-Sports Highlights (2019–2020)
Bakbakan Na (2013–2017)
Basque Pelota (2009–2010)
Battle of Yokohama (2001, produced by Viva Sports)
Bigtime Bakbakan (2011–2013)
BYK101 (2003–2004)
CESAFI (2015)
Chicken Talk (2016–2019)
Community Basketball Association (2019)
Elorde sa Trese (1998–2000, produced by Vintage Sports)
Extreme Games (1996–1998, produced by Vintage Sports)
Fist of Fury (2001, produced by Viva Sports)
Gillette World of Sports (1996–2000, produced by Vintage Sports)
The Finest Hour (2003)
The Golf Channel Hour (1998)
Golf Power (2000)
Golf Watch (1997–1998, produced by Vintage Sports)
Hataw Pinoy (2006–2011)
Hot Shots (1998–2000)
Hot Stuff (1996–1999, produced by Vintage Television)
Jai Alai Games (1980)
KKK: Kabayo, Karera, Karerista (1996–2001)
Maharlika Pilipinas Basketball League (2021)
The Main Event (2002–2003, 2008–2013, produced by Viva Sports)
Mano-Mano Pro Boxing
Manny Pacquiao Sports Idol (2004)
Marlboro Tour (1996–2000, produced by Vintage Television)
MBA on IBC (1998)
Milo Sporting World (2000–2001, produced by Viva Television)
Morning Stretch
Motoring Today (1989–2005, produced by Sunshine Television, Inc.)
NAASCU (2015)
NCAA on AKTV (2012)
NCAA on Vintage Sports (1996–1999)
NFL Touchdown (1996)
Pacific Xtreme Combat (2011–2013)
PBA Classics on Vintage Sports (1996)
PBA D-League (2011–2013, 2014–2015)
PBA on AKTV/Sports5 (2011–2013)
PBA on NBN/IBC (2003)
PBA on Vintage Sports (1996–1999)
PBA on Viva TV (2000–2002)
PBL Games (1999–2000, produced by Vintage Television)
Philippine Secondary Schools Basketball League (2017)
Pilipinas Sabong Sports (2005–2009)
Pinoy Wrestling (1989)
Ringside at Elorde (1983–1987)
Rod Nazario's In This Corner
Sabong TV: Ang #1 Sabong Show ng Bayan (2005–2011, 2013–2023)
Sagupaan Global Cockfights
Shakey's Super League (2022, also broadcast on Solar Sports)
Shakey's V-League (2004–2005, 2012–2013)
Shoot Fest (2001)
Silip sa Karera (1986–1991, 1991–1992)
Sports Review (1998–2000)
Sports Review
Sports Tambayan (2011, produced by Sports5)
Sports Valley Jai-Alai (2009–2010, 2011)
Stoplight TV (June-August 2014)
Strictly Dancesport (1996–2000, produced by Vintage Sports)
Super Bouts (1996–2001, produced by Vintage Sports)
Super Champs (1996–1998, produced by Vintage Sports)
Take Me Out of the Ball Game (1998)
Tapondo at ang Tigasin
Tennis Review
Tilaok TV (2019–2020)
Tukaan (1998–2017)
UAAP Games (1989–1990, produced by Kampana Television)
United Football League (2011–2013)
Universities and Colleges Basketball League (2016–2017)
World Pool League (2002)

Educational programs
AgriTV Atbp.: Kasama sa Hanapbuhay (2022–2023, produced by Visivo Productions)
A Taste of Life with Heny Sison (2000–2007)
Ating Alamin (1994–2005, 2007–2009)
Beauty School with Ricky Reyes (1988–1990)
Communicating with Wilma (1980)
Cooking It Up with Nora (1977)
DepEd TV (2020–2022, produced by Department of Education)
 DokyuBata TV (2022–2023, produced by National Council for Children's Television)
Gintong Uhay (2011)
Hayop Mag-Alaga (2007–2009)
Home Sweet House
Lucida DS: United Shelter Health Show (2008–2009)
Mommy Academy (2007–2008, produced by Ka Gerry Geronimo Productions)
Mula sa Edukador (2019, produced by SMAC Television Production)
Padayon: The NCCA Hour (2022–2023, produced by National Commission for Culture and the Arts)
Talents Academy (2019–2020)
Tipong Pinoy (1998 version; 2010–2015)
Tipong Pinoy (2003 version; 2011–2013)

Travel shows
Bayan ni Juan (2001)
Cooltura (2011–2012, 2019–2020)
Biyaheng Langit (2008–2013)
LakbayTV (2003–2004)
Lakbay Pinas (2021, 2022)
Lumad TV (produced by People's Television Network, 2019–2022)
Magandang Umaga Ba? (1995–1998)
Salaam TV (produced by People's Television Network, 2019–2022)
Travel and Trade (2001–2002; re-runs, 2010–2011, 2014, 2018–2019)
Travel: Philippines (2002–2004)
Travel Time (1986–1991)

Lifestyle
AM @ IBC (2003–2009)
amTV (2003–2005)
Chi (2009–2010)

Film and special presentation
13's Mini Masterpiece
Armchair Theatre
Blockbuster Movies Weekly
Box Office Highlights
Bulalakaw
Chinese Movies
Cine Pinoy (1975–1989, 1990–1991)
Cine Spectacular
Cineguide
Cinema 13
Cinemax (1992–1995)
Drama, Aksyon, Atbp
Extreme Action Theater (1998–1999)
First Screening
Ginintuang Ala-Ala
IBC Movie Serials
IBC Specials
IBCinema (1975–1986)
IBCinema Nights (2006–2008)
IBCinema Presents (1986–1988)
Kaibigan Special Sunday (2019, produced by SMAC Television Production)
Monday's Movie Magic (1996–1998)
Movie Date
Movie Time (1975–1986, 1989–1990)
Network Premiere
Now Showing (2000–2001)
Pelikula sa Trese (1989)
Pinoy Aksyon Hits (2003–2009)
PPP: Piling Piling Pelikula (1975–1996)
Premier Night Telecine (1996–1997, produced by Vintage Television)
Premiere Theatre
Primetime Sinemax (2006–2008)
Saturday Blockbusters
Sine Itutuloy
Sine Komiks (2009–2010)
Sine Kulay
Sine VTV (1999; produced by Vintage Television)
Sinemaks (1998–2003)
Spectacular Action on Screen (1987)
Sunday's Big Showdown (1996–1998, produced by Vintage Television)
Sunday Night Special (1988–1990)
Tagalog Box Office Hits
TeleViva Specials (2001)
Thursday Night at the Movies (2000–2001)
Top 10 Best Movie Trailers of the Week Compiled by Teddy Hayden Lim
Tuesday Movie Treat
TV Movie Matinee
Viva Action Cinema (2001)
Viva Box Office (2001–2003)
Viva Box Office Hits (1986–1988)
Viva Premiere Night (2000–2001)
Viva Proudly Presents (2000–2001)
Wednesday's Main Event (1997–1998)

Movie trailer shows
Movie Eye
Movie Sneek Preview (1986–1989)
Top 10 Best Movie Trailers of the Week Compiled by Teddy Hayden Lim (1994–2007, 2010–2011)

Other programs
amTV (2004–2005)
ASEAN 101 (2019, produced by People's Television Network, 2019)
ASEAN Spotlight TV (2019–2022, produced by People's Television Network)
EBC Earth Files (2002–2011)
EZ Buy (2015–2016)
EZ Shop (2004–2020, 2022)
Global Family Series (2003–2005)
Home Shopping Network (2004–2011, 2014–2015)
Japan Video Topics (2003–2010)
Kinabuhing Sugbuanon (1977)
Metro TV Shopping (1999–2004)
Oras ng Kings (2021)
Quantum Channel (1999–2003)
Retro TV (2003–2004; re-run, 2004–2007, 2014, 2019)
Shop Japan (2016)
Shopping Bug
Smart TV Shopping (1998–2002)
Tagamend (2008–2018)
Totoo (Lunas) (2019)
TV Shop Philippines (2015–2020)
Value Vision (1996–2005)
Winner TV Shopping (2002–2014)

Music videos
America's Top 10 (1981–1993)
Asian Music Television
Top 5 (1988)
Viva Hot Hits (2001–2002)
Viva Music Channel (2001–2002)

Religious
All For Jesus Happenings (1979–1995)
Ang Dating Daan (1983–1986, 1987–1990)
Ang Iglesia ni Cristo (2001)
Answers with Bayless Conley (2001)
Asin At Ilaw (2008–2011)
The Bishop's Move
Believer's Voice of Victory (2006–2010)
Bukas-Loob sa Diyos
Don Stewart Power & Mercy
El Shaddai (1992–2020)
Friends Again (1999–2007)
Family TV Mass (2002–2014, 2015–2019)
Gideon 300 (1983–1987)
The Gospel of the Kingdom with Pastor Apollo C. Quiboloy (2001–2005; 2012–2015, hook-up with SMNI)
Great Day to Live with Bro. Greg Durante
Hour of Power (2003)
The Hour Of Truth (1991–1995)
Iglesia ni Cristo and the Bible
Jesus Miracle Crusade (1975–1988)
Jesus The Healer
Jimmy Swaggart (1980–1985)
Kerygma TV (2011–2020)
The Key of David (2001)
Mga Himala at Gintong Aral ni El Shaddai (1994–1997)
The Message (1992–1998)
Misa Tradionalis: Latin Mass and Cathechism (2020)
A New Life With Jesus
Nothing But a Truth
Oras ng Himala (1996–2001)
Oras ng Katotohanan (1993–1995, 2001–2018)
Power & Mercy (2006–2010)
Powerline (1995–2004)
Power to Unite with Elvira (2006–2010, 2019–2020)
The Rex Humbard World Outreach Ministry (1977)
Saint Peregrine: TV Sunday Mass (1989–2008)
Shalom with Fr. Archie C. Guiriba, OFM (2014; 2017–2018)
Signs and Wonders (2009–2011)
The Jim Bakker Show
Stop Suffering (1998)
Study In The Word (1982–1985)
T.A.H.O (Tawanan at Awitan kay Hesus Oras-oras) (1993–1996)
Tinig ng Kanyang Pagbabalik (2005–2011)
This is Your Day (2001–2011)
Try God (1981–1991)

Regional programming
Davao Express Balita (2002–2003; IBC Davao)
IBC News 5:30 Report Cebu  (1992–1995)
IBC News Tonight Cebuano Edition (2002–2003)
IBC News Tonight Karon Cebu  (2003–2011)
IBC TV X-Press Cebu (1995)
IBC TV X-Press Karon (1995–1996)
Ikaw Kabuhi Ko (1975–1997; 1999–2003; IBC Iloilo)
Newsday Cebu (1982–1990)
PaniudTALK (IBC Iloilo)

Acquired programming

Asianovela
Amazing Twins (2003)
Minning Town (2021–2022)

Drama

American
12 O'Clock High
Gunsmoke (1975)
How the West Was Won
The Rat Patrol
The Rockford Files
The Runaways

Telenovelas
Carita de Ángel (2001–2003)
Maria del Cielo (2001–2002)
Natalia (2002)
Por un beso (2001–2003)
La Teniente (June-August 2014)
The Two Sides of Ana (June-August 2014)

Variety
The Jacksons (1979–1980)

Comedy

American
The Monkees

American/Canadian series
Afternoon Affair
Amazing Stories (1996–1997)
America's Funniest Home Videos (1990–1999)
America's Funniest People
Animalia (June-August 2014)
Baretta
Bikini Open
Cool Detective (1996–1997)
Cyberkidz
The Dating Game
Family Ties (1984–1989)
The Gallant Men
Gadgets & Gizmos (June-August 2014)
Harry O
Jason of Star Command
The Jerry Lewis Show
Knights and Warriors
Kung Fu
Lifestyles of the Rich and Famous
Lone Ranger
Lucan (1978)
The Magic of Mark Wilson
The Manhunter
Max Headroom
The Mighty Jungle
New Zoo Revue
Pacific Blue
Party of Five (1996–1997)
Saved by the Bell
Search
Secrets & Mysteries
Seinfeld (1991–1998)
Sesame Street (1987–1989)
Solid Gold
A Star is Born
Starsky & Hutch
Tarzan
The Equalizer (1996–1997)
The Mighty Jungle (1996–1997)
The Naked Truth (1996–1997)
The New Adventures of Tarzan
The Single Guy (1996–1997)
That's Incredible! (1990–1992)
Totally Hidden Video
Video Fashion
Voyagers!
Wanted: Dead or Alive
War of the Worlds
The Wild Wild West (1975–1981)
Wok With Yan

Australian TV shows
Bellamy
Beyond Stardom (June-August 2014)
Hi-5 (June-August 2014)
The Lost Islands

British TV shows
Game Girls

Japanese TV shows
Kawaii International (2014–2016)
Kawaii PH TV (2014–2016)

Other
The Big Planet (June-August 2014)
Boost (June-August 2014)
Cultural Flavors (June-August 2014)
Fame (June-August 2014)
Fashion Memoir (June-August 2014)
Cinema Nouveau (June-August 2014)

Documentary
Colours of ASEAN (2022)
Stories from China (2022-2023)

Anime and Tokusatsu
Armored Fleet Dairugger XV
Go-Q-Choji Ikkiman (Battle Ball) (1996–1998)
Bioman 
Candy Candy
Crayon Shin-chan (2002–2003)
Cyborg 009
Cyborg Kuro-chan (2002–2003)
Daimos
Dragon Quest (1996–1998)
Getter Robo
Getter Robo G
Jiban (Tagalog version)
Kamen Rider Black (1992–1999; Tagalog version)
King Arthur (1982)
Lulu, The Flower Girl
Machineman (1992–1997; Tagalog version)
Maskman (1992–1993; Tagalog version)
Mighty Orbots
Thundersub
Time Quest (1995–1998)
Tonde Burin (as "Super Boink") (1995–1996)
Shaider (1992–1994; Tagalog Version)
Sky Ranger Gavan (1996–1997; Tagalog version)
Super Rescue Solbrain (1998–1999; English version)
Starzinger
Dragon Quest (1997; Tagalog version)
Turborangers (1994–1996; Tagalog version)
Voltes V (1989)
Voltron (1988–1989)
Winspector (1997–1998; Tagalog version)
Yu Yu Hakusho (as "Ghost Fighter") (1995–1997)

Cartoon shows
The Adventures of Sinbad
The Alvin Show (1964)
Care Bears
Casper and the Angels
Challenge of the GoBots (1987)
Denver, the Last Dinosaur (1990–1993)
Felix the Cat (1962)
G.I. Joe (1987)
Gogo's Adventures with English
Huckleberry Hound
Inspector Gadget
The Magical Adventures of Quasimodo
Mighty Man and Yukk
Pac-Man
Plastic Man
Popeye
Rainbow Brite (1987)
Rambo and the Forces of Freedom (1987)
Saber Rider and the Star Sheriffs
Sky Commanders
The Smurfs
Snorks
Star Blazers (1981)
Teenage Mutant Ninja Turtles (1989)
The Transformers (1989)
Tom and Jerry
Woody Woodpecker (1989)
Widget
Yogi Bear

Sports shows
All-Star Professional Wrestling
Football Fanatics (2014)
NBA Action
NBA on IBC (1996–2001, 2002–2004)
ONE Fighting Championship (2013–2015)
World Championship Wrestling
WWE Bottom Line (2012–2013)
WWE SmackDown (2012–2013)
Whacked Out Sports (2012–2013)

Sports coverages
 1990 Beijing Asian Games
 1991 Manila SEA Games (together with ABS-CBN-2, PTV-4, GMA-7, and RPN-9)
 1993 Singapore SEA Games (together with ABS-CBN-2)
 1998 Bangkok Asian Games (with Vintage Television)
 2003 World Pool Masters
 2005 Manila SEA Games (November 27–December 5, 2005, together with ABC 5 and NBN-4)
 2007 Nakhon Ratchasima SEA Games (December 6–15, 2007, together with ABC 5 and NBN 4)
 2011 Jakarta-Palembang SEA Games (November 11–22, 2011, together with ABS-CBN Sports, and Studio 23)
 12th Euromed Storm International Bowling Masters Challenge (October 8, 2015)
 34th Cebuana Lhuillier PCA Open ITF Men's Futures (October 16–18, 2015)
 Clear Dream Match: Team Phil vs. Team James^ (August 24, 2013)
 Manny Pacquiao vs. Shane Mosley Fight^ (May 8, 2011)
 Manny Pacquiao vs. Juan Manuel Marquez Marquez 3 Boxing Fight^ (2011)
 Manny Pacquiao vs. Brandon Rios: Fight as One1 (November 24–26, 2013)
 Manny Pacquiao vs. Chris Algieri Hungry for Glory1 (November 23, 2014)
 NBA on GMA (1996–2001, 2002–2004)
 NBA All-Star Game (1997–2001, 2003–2004)
 NBA Finals (1997–2001, 2003–2004)
 NBA Playoffs (1997–2001, 2003–2004)
 ONE FC: Return of Warriors/Rise to Power Special (November 25–26, 2013)
 ONE FC: Champions and Warriors (Kings and Champions/Battle of Heroes) special (November 25–26, 2013)
 Pagalingan '97: 3rd Ming Ramos Golf Classic (October 18, 1997)
 Philippine Basketball Association (1996–2003, 2011–2013)
 PBA on Vintage Sports (1996–1999)
 PBA on Viva TV (2000–2002)
 PBA on NBN/IBC (2003)
 PBA on AKTV1 (2011–2013)
PBA All-Star Weekend (1996–2001, 2003, 2011–2012)
PBA Finals Series1 (1996–2003, 2012–2013)
PBA Rookie Draft1 (1996–2003, 2011–2012)
 Ring Kings: Cotto Vs. Mayweather Boxing Fight^ (2012)
 Vindication: Manny Pacquiao vs. Timothy Bradley II Fight¹ (April 13–14, 2014)

^in cooperation with AKTV/Sports5
1with Solar Sports

Election coverage specials
Botohan '98 (May 11–12, 1998, together with Radyo Veritas and Pilipino Star)
Bantay Halalan 2001 (May 14–15, 2001, together with RPN, RMN, Manila Standard and Manila Bulletin)
Hatol ng Bayan: Kampanya 2004 
Hatol ng Bayan 2007 
Hatol ng Bayan: AutoVote 2010 
Hatol ng Bayan 2013 
Hatol ng Bayan 2016 
Hatol ng Bayan 2019 
Hatol ng Bayan 2022

Special events
14th Annual FAP Film Academy Awards Night (June 1, 1996)
30th Annual Aliw Awards Night (December 26, 2017)
31st Awit Awards (October 28, 2018)
35th FAP Luna Awards (September 3, 2017)
36th FAP Luna Awards (October 21, 2018)
Anak TV Seal Awards (January 18, 2014)
Binibining Pilipinas (1987, 1988)
 DepEd Distance Learning Dry-Run (August 11–14 and September 21–25, 2020)
1979 Miss International Pageant (December 7, 1979)
Metro Manila Film Festival Gabi ng Parangal (1990–1991, December 29, 2016)
Metro Manila Film Festival Parade of Stars (1990–1991, December 23, 2016)
Miss Manila 2016 (June 26, 2016)
Miss World 2001 (November 17, 2001)
PMPC Star Awards for Movies (1984–1999)
PMPC Star Awards for Television (1989–1999 and 2005)

TV specials
4th Pilipinas Open International Dance Championship (October 14, 2018)
10th Fashion Extravaganza: Fashion Show for a Cause (December 26, 1998)
The 17th Nanning International Folk Song Arts Festival Gala (September 27, 2015)
2019 Nanning Transnational Spring Festival (February 5, 2019)
89.1 DMZ Anniversary Special (November 18, 1999)
A Celebration: IBC TV-13's 10th Anniversary Special (February 1985)
A Night with the Stars: A Concert for a Cause (December 26, 2017)
Actors Guild of the Philippines President's Cup Shootfest (December 10, 2017)
Ang Laban ni Ninoy (2005)
Ang Paglilitis: Katarungan para sa Bayan (January–May 2012, together with PTV)
Ateneo Law School 25th Anniversary Documentary Special (2011)
Balay Tirahan Kanlungan (September 2011; re-run, 2013–2014, 2016–2017, 2018–2019)
Barack Obama: His Story1 (April 25–27, 2014)
Bayanihan para sa Hagdang Palayan - A RTVM Special Feature (October 2013; re-runs, 2013–2014)
Bridges of Love: A Regine Velasquez Concert (October 25, 2003)
Bulong ng Anghel (December 12, 1999)
Catholic Mass Media Awards (2000, October 26, 2002)
The Challenge of EDSA
Conclave of Pope Benedict XVI: Live at the Vatican (April 2005)
Disney on Ice (December 31, 2003 – January 1, 2004)
EDSA People Power 4th Anniversary Concert (February 25, 1990)
Eid al-Fitr Facing the Challenge of COVID-19 (May 24, 2020)
El Shaddai Anniversary Overnight (August 1993–August 2019)
Feature on Blessed Alvaro del Portillo (December 24, 2020)
Gemmalyn Crosby Sports Festival (November 26, 2017)
Hello... Hello... Maricel (March 1986) 
Homecoming Sa 13: Isang Pasasalamat (November 21, 1998)
IBC Headliners Breaking News 9/11 Attack Special Coverage (September 11–16, 2001)
KBP Golden Dove Awards (1986–1989 and 2001)
Kultura ng Kahandaan (June 28, 2014)
The Last Journey of Ninoy (2013)
Mandela: "Messenger Of People"1 (April 25, 2014)
Mga Pinoy sa Tsina (October 31, 2021)
Michelle Obama: The First Lady in Style1 (April 25–27, 2014)
Music and the Spoken Word Easter Specials1 (April 20, 2014)
Music and the Spoken Word Christmas Specials1 (December 24–25, 2019; December 31, 2019-January 1, 2020; January 4–5, 2020)
Ninoy: The Legacy Comes an Age (August 21, 2004)
Noli Me Tangere Rizal Day Marathon Special (December 30–31, 2013)
One For The Heart: IBC 13 Pusong Pinoy Relaunch Special Live at the PICC (1989)
Online Mobile Gaming (September 23, 2018)
The Original No. 1: IBC-13's Legacy to Philippine Television (March 8, 2019, re-aired March 11, 2019, and June 12, 2019)
Paalam... Pangulong Cory (August 1–5, 2009, together with NBN and RPN)
Pagsisiyasat: PDAF Scamdalo (2013)
Pilipinas at Indonesia (December 26, 2014)
PiliPinas Debates 2022: The Turning Point (March 19 – April 3, 2022)
People Power: The Philippine Experience (June 12, 1986, re-aired July 4, 1986)
The Performers: Showbiz Industry Alliance (April 29, 2018)
Philippine Military Academy Graduating Exercises (March, yearly)
PMCC 4th Watch International Missionary Day 2018 (January 14, 2018)
Pope Francis sa Pilipinas (January 15–19, 2015, together with PTV)
Public Briefing: #LagingHandaPH (March 23, 2020–October 3, 2020, June 6, 2022–present)
Puso at Diwa ni Ninoy
Rakrakan Festival 2018 (April 29, 2018)
Regal at 15: Regal Films 15th Anniversary Celebration and Mother Lily's Birthday (August 14, 1988)
Sa Tabi ng Inang Lawa: NCCA Documentary (2013–2014)
Signing of the Comprehensive Agreement of the BANGSAMORO (March 27, 2014, together with PTV)
Sharon On Stage: One Night Only (2001)
 Star for a Night Grand Finals Night (March 1, 2003)
A Taste of History: Isang Malinamnam na Kalayaan (June 12, 2012; re-runs, 2013–2014, 2015)
Tulong ng Bayan: Yolanda Watch (November 7–25, 2013, together with PTV)
World Economic Forum on East Asia Manila Live Coverage (May 21–23, 2014, together with PTV)
The 4th World Meeting of Families, Manila 2003 (January 22–25, 2003, together with ABS-CBN and GMA Network)
Yolanda: Ang Pagbangon - A RTVM Special Feature (December 31, 2013)

1 with ATC @ IBC

Christmas specials
Ang Pagdating ng Hari: Isang Pamaskong Alamat ni Fr. James Reuter, S.J. (UP Stage Play) (December 24, 2013)
An Enchanting Christmas Special (December 25, 2003)
Christmas Mass with Pope John Paul II (December 2003)
El Shaddai Christmas Overnight (December 1993–2017)
Music and the Spoken Word Christmas Specials1 (December 24–25, 2019 / December 31, 2019–January 1, 2020)
UST Christmas Concert Gala 2013 (December 24, 2013)
 UP Handel's Messiah 2014 (December 25, 2014)

Year-end specials
Review 2001: The IBC News and Public Affairs Yearender Special (December 31, 2001)
Review 2002: The IBC News and Public Affairs Yearender Special (December 30, 2002)
Review 2003: The IBC News and Public Affairs Yearender Special (December 29, 2003)
Review 2004: The IBC News and Public Affairs Yearender Special (December 27, 2004)

Holy Week specials
El Shaddai Holy Week and Easter Overnight (1994–2018)
Journey to God's Heart with Fr. Jerry Orbos, SVD (April 17–18, 2014)
Pahayag ng Tagumpay: Good Friday Reflections Special by Moringa Lifeoil (April 18, 2014)
St. Josemaria is Like a Father Finding God In Everyday Work (Holy Week 2013–2014)
Shalom 3-Day Lenten Retreat (Holy Week 2008–2018)
Seven Last Words TV Special (produced by Make Mine Creative Productions, Good Friday 2011–re-run, 2021)

See also
Intercontinental Broadcasting Corporation
List of programs broadcast by Intercontinental Broadcasting Corporation

References

Intercontinental Broadcasting Corporation shows
Intercontinental Broadcasting Corporation
Intercontinental Broadcasting Corporation